Moroccan rap music is a Moroccan musical style related to rap and hip hop culture.

Chronology
Moroccan's hip-hop and urban culture history dates back to the mid-1990s, when, after hip-hop's emergence in Western culture, Moroccan immigrant youth in Europe transferred the new musical style back to Morocco upon their returns home.

Rap and urban music have since gained a following in major urban centers in Morocco. Moroccan rap, a favorite genre for many Moroccans, especially Moroccan youth, speaks out and protests on social and political issues.

Bibliography
 Lamarkbi, N., Fièvre hip-hop au Maroc in Jeune Afrique, 16/10/2006, https://www.jeuneafrique.com/216144/archives-thematique/fi-vre-hip-hop-au-maroc/
 Abu Ghanim, K., 2009, Les changements de la nouvelle musique jeune au Maroc (in Arabic), Université Mohamed V, Agdal, Rabat.
 Guerrero Parado, J. (2012). Zanka Flow: Rap en árabe marroquí. In Romano-Arabica 12, pp. 125–157 
 Gintsburg, Sarali (2013). I'll spit my rap for y'all... in darija: Local and global in Moroccan hip hop culture. In Evolution des pratiques et représentations langagières dans le Maroc du 21e siècle (Vol 2), Benítez-Fernández, M., Miller, C. de Ruiter, J and Tamer, Y. (Eds), 186–207. Paris, L’Harmattan.

See also

 Moroccan music 
 Arabic hip hop
 Culture of Morocco

References

External links
 I Love Hip Hop in Morocco. Award-winning documentary film about the first Hip Hop festival in Morocco (2007).
  RAP marocain: Quand la Jeunesse se rebelle, un dossier à propos du rap marocain paru dans Le Journal Hebdomadaire.
  RAP marocain: Rap marocain, portail musical qui répertorie les musiques favorites des marocains.
  Rap marocain sur Wikimusique - author Mario Scolas - GFDL
  Maroc Tant de chaînes à briser... par Kenza Sefrioui, janvier 2011